Tom Fruin (born 1974, Los Angeles) is a contemporary American sculptor. He currently lives and works in Brooklyn, New York City. Fruin graduated from University of California, Santa Barbara with a BA in 1996.

Work 

Known for his large scale installations, Fruin most commonly uses steel and highly colored plexiglass to create monumental sculptures referencing local building structures. He describes his drive to make art that is publicly accessible, as well as sustainable by working with reclaimed materials and alternative energy. Fruin's largest installation to date, the Watertower series, is installed on multiple rooftops across New York City and around the country. Other large scale work has been exhibited in public plazas in Prague, Vienna, Copenhagen and throughout the United States.

References 

1974 births
21st-century American sculptors
21st-century American male artists
American male sculptors
Artists from New York City
Sculptors from California
University of California, Santa Barbara alumni
Living people
Sculptors from New York (state)